Le Grand Voyage is a 2004 film written and directed by Ismaël Ferroukhi. The film portrays the relationship between father and son as both embark on  a religious pilgrimage trip by car. The film won the Golden Astor for Best Film at the 2005 Mar del Plata International Film Festival, also was shown at the prestigious 2004 Toronto and Venice International Film Festivals.

Plot
Réda (Nicolas Cazalé) is a French-Moroccan teenager due to sit for his Baccalauréat in southern France. When his devout father (played by Mohamed Majd) asks Réda to drive him on a pilgrimage to Mecca, he reluctantly agrees.  The route taken by the father and son goes from Provence, France through Italy, Slovenia, Croatia, Serbia, Bulgaria, Turkey, Syria, and Jordan before reaching Saudi Arabia.

During this road trip of thousands of kilometers, the once-icy father-and-son relationship starts to thaw.  Réda speaks only in French to his father, who is seen speaking only Arabic. Later, the father shows that he speaks impeccable French: his choice to speak only Arabic to his son is, therefore, purposeful.

Along the way, the two meet several interesting characters, including an aged woman clad in black who, though they attempt to leave her behind, reappears in various scenes. The son learns about Islam and why his father preferred to go by car rather than plane. Different situations show differences between the father and son. In one instance, for example, after the father claimed to have been robbed, Réda refuses to give any of the remaining money to a begging mother with a child, but his father does so.

During their journey, Réda dreams that he is watching his father herding goats and that his father does not respond when he calls for help to be saved from quicksand.

After many hardships, they reach Mecca but the father, unknown to Réda, dies shortly after they arrive. That night, Réda goes looking for his father, but instead sees a person herding goats who barely glances at him. After Réda finds out that his father has died, he sells the car and gives the money to a beggar.

Cast
Nicolas Cazalé – Réda
Mohamed Majd – The Father
Jacky Nercessian – Mustapha
Ghina Ognianova – The old woman
Kamel Belghazi – Khalid
Atik Mohamed – Le pélerin Ahmad

Production
Most scenes that were set in the Middle East were shot in Morocco. However, some scenes involving the two principal actors were shot in Mecca. While the Saudi Arabian government had previously permitted documentary crews to shoot in Mecca, this was the first fiction feature permitted to shoot during the Hajj. The film's director, Ismaël Ferroukhi, said that while shooting in Mecca, "no one looked at the camera; people didn't even seem to see the crew – they're in another world."

Reception
Le Grand Voyage has an 86% approval rating on Rotten Tomatoes based on 7 reviews, with an average rating of 7/10.

References

External links

2004 films
2004 drama films
French drama road movies
French coming-of-age films
2000s French-language films
2000s Arabic-language films
French road movies
2000s drama road movies
Films about Islam
Films shot in Bulgaria
Films set in France
Films set in Italy
Films set in Serbia
Films set in Turkey
Films set in Syria
Films set in Saudi Arabia
2004 directorial debut films
2000s French films